R322 road may refer to:
 R322 road (Ireland)
 R322 road (South Africa)